The Singapore Space and Technology Ltd (SSTL) is a non-governmental space organisation based in Singapore within the aerospace industry. 

Recognised by the International Astronautical Federation, SSTL's stated mission is "to harness and advance space technologies [it] connects the different players in the region's growing aerospace sector to government agencies in the region, B2B and B2C technology companies and non-government organisations. The focus is to accelerate the adoption and commercialisation of space-related innovations, and to cultivate space talent ahead of the curve."

Advisory Council 
The organization is led by its current board of directors with Jonathan Hung as the current chairman, and an advisory council composed of representatives of stakeholders in the Singapore Aerospace industry.

Satellite launch program and experiment facilities

SSTL-JAXA Kibo launch agreement 
On 15 November 2017, SSTL signed a contract with the Japan Aerospace Exploration Agency (JAXA) to launch the "SpooQy - 1" CubeSAT developed by the National University of Singapore (NUS) via the Kibo Program on board the International Space Station. SpooQy-1 will attempt to demonstrate quantum entanglement using a CubeSat in Low Earth Orbit (LEO).

SSTL is also Singapore’s sole administrator for the utilisation of the Japanese Experiment Module (JEM) on the International Space Station (ISS) for education and technical development. JEM, also known as Kibo (the Japanese word for "hope") is the Japanese science module of the ISS and the largest ISS module.

A wide variety of scientific, medical, and educational experiments are conducted on the JEM. These include experiments to be conducted by Japanese astronauts of in-orbit testing of new technologies in actual space environments, as well as launching of CubeSats and microsats.

Industry programs

Asia Pacific Regional Space Agency Forum (APRSAF) 
SSTL co-organises the regional rotational APRSAF conference with JAXA whenever Singapore plays host to the annual conference. Organising the 18th edition of APRSAF in 2011, SSTA organised the 25th edition of APRSAF in 2018.

Global Space and Technology Conference (GSTC) 
SSTL organszes the Global Space and Technology Conference (GSTC) annually in February. The GSTC is the Asia's premier space and technology event, facilitating trade and regional collaboration for space and satellite businesses.

Speakers and Moderators for previous GSTCs have included:

 S Iswaran, Minister for Trade and Industry (Industry)
 Shizuo Yamamoto, Vice President, JAXA
 Noordin Ahmad, Director General ANGKASA
 Salem Humaid Al Marri, Assistant Director General, Mohammed bin Rashid Space Centre
 Franco Ongaro, Director European Space Agency
 Hugues de Galzain, Vice President Airbus Defence and Space
 Luis Gomes, Chief Technology Officer Surrey Satellite Technologies
 Hervé Hamy, Vice President Thales Alenia Space
 Tan Kong Hwee Executive Director, Singapore Economic Development Board

SSTL Space Industry Awareness Talk 
SSTL works in collaboration with the National Trade Union Council (NTUC) Employment and Employability Institute to organise space exposure talks to bring the space industry to the general public.

Educational programs and outreach

International Space Challenge 
Each year, SSTL organises the International Space Challenge (ISC) - an international space design competition that challenges student teams to leverage space technology to tackle real world challenges. It connects young minds across the globe with industry experts, to nurture interest in space technology and its applications., as well as to find new solutions and create a pathway for future commercialisation of these ideas.

Started in 2007 as the Singapore Space Challenge (SSC), it was a national space design competition to challenge student teams to leverage space technology. Since then, it has become a landmark platform with global reach. The SSC rebranded as the International Space Challenge (ISC) in 2021 with the aim of increasing diversity and to generate more accreditation from global organisations. Over 2000 youths have come through the doors of the challenge, drawing interest from over 20 countries around the world. 

Held annually, the challenge calls for youths to work in teams to solve problems developed closely with the industry. From there they will derive theoretical models, design prototypes, and create simulations of their creative solutions. During the challenge, they will receive mentorship from industry and subject matter experts, and gain access to technical tools to help them complete their proposal. Final entries are reviewed and judged by esteemed technical leaders from around the world. To date, youths have created solutions for ‘Designing a Lunar Rover’, ‘Solution for Space Debris’, ‘Design a satellite system for disaster mapping’.

Asian Try-Zero G Challenge 
SSTL co-ordinates Singaporean submissions for the Asian Try-Zero G Challenge sent to JAXA. In 2016, a Singaporean mission idea was successfully selected and the experiment was performed aboard the International Space Station.

Humanitarian Assistance and Disaster Relief Challenge 
Across the world, countries have recognized the need of utilizing remote sensing satellite technologies as a critical tool in real-time disaster management. SSTL launched the HADR (Humanitarian Assistance and Disaster Relief) challenge, to stimulate and tap into the creativity of companies, start-ups, research groups or even students and identify new and translatable solutions to complex problems of coordination and technology usage within the context of HADR.

Current and previous participating organisations have included World Bank, GISTDA, and National University of Singapore to name a few.

Satellite Foundation Course 
Intended to teach participants aged 18 years and above the basics of building a nanosatellite.

Venture building programmes

Space Accelerator Programme 
In 2020, SSTL launched its first ever space-based accelerator programme in Singapore to provide specialised support for space tech startups in this niche sector. The accelerator programme is supported by Enterprise Singapore (ESG). Through the programme, SSTL works with local and international startups of varying maturity levels from pre-seed up to Series B, who are working on space hardware products and services. It currently has over 30 international and local startups in its program.

Project Cyclotron 
SSTL has also partnered with Cap Vista on a specialised track called Project Cyclotron, which supports early-stage high-risk space hardware startups that are developing deep technologies.

References 

2007 establishments in Singapore
Organisations based in Singapore
Organizations established in 2007